Välkommen du härliga juletid or I juletid is a Christmas song with lycis by Paul Nilsson.

Compositions
 Music by Ejnar Eklöf, published 1921, also published in Nu ska vi sjunga 1943, under the lines "Julsånger".
 Music by Gustaf Nordqvist, published in Sveriges melodibok 1947.

Recordings
The song has been recorded by various artists and groups. An early recording was done by Ragnar Blennow in 1928.

Publication
Julens önskesångbok, 1997, under the lines "Traditionella julsånger".

References 

1921 songs
Swedish Christmas songs